Phytolacca icosandra, sometimes known as button pokeweed or tropical pokeweed, is a species of flowering plant found in the neotropics and introduced into the warmer areas of the western USA.

It reaches up to 3 m in height, with leaves of 10–20 cm by 9–14 cm. The flowers are produced in racemes 10–15 cm long, each flower 5–10 mm diameter, with 8-20 stamens (icosandra means "twenty stamens"). The fruit is a black berry, 5–8 mm diameter.

References

External links

 Phytolacca icosandra in the Flora of North America
 description and photographs (in Spanish): Área de Conservación Guanacaste, Costa Rica 
 description and one photograph (in Spanish): the Secretaría del Medio Ambiente y Recursos Naturales, SEMARNAT, the Mexican government's Secretariat of Environment and Natural Resources

icosandra
Plants described in 1759
Taxa named by Carl Linnaeus